Ars Rediviva was a Czech classical instrumental music group, whose historically-informed performances played a key role in the revival of Baroque music in Czechoslovakia.

Ars Rediviva chamber ensemble
The group was founded in 1951 in Prague by flautist and musicologist Milan Munclinger and his wife, pianist and harpsichordist Viktorie Švihlíková (she was later succeeded by Josef Hála). The original lineup also consisted of two prominent members of the Czech Philharmonic, cellist František Sláma and oboist Stanislav Duchoň (later succeeded by violinists Václav Snítil and Antonín Novák). From 1951 to 1956 Václav Talich collaborated with Ars Rediviva.

Orchestra, soloists
The band's repertoire consisted largely of chamber music, the works of  J. S. Bach ranking high on the list. Depending on score requirements, the ensemble's size expanded regularly up to the chamber orchestra having mainly Czech Philharmonic instrumentalists as members (a complete string group with its section leaders, prominent wind-players, for example solo flautists Géza Novák and František Čech, solo oboist Jiří Mihule, solo bassoonists Karel Bidlo and František Herman, solo horn-players Miroslav Štefek and Zdeněk Tylšar, solo double-bass player František Pošta, etc.). 
Ars Rediviva collaborated with the Czech Philharmonic Choir, Czech singers (Karel Berman, Ladislav Mráz, Jana Jonášová, Virginia Walterová, Ludmila Vernerová, etc.), and foreign artists, specializing in performances of Baroque and Classical music (e.g. András Adorján, Theo Altmeyer, Maurice André, Nedda Casei, Otto Peter, Jean-Pierre Rampal).

Season performances (1954–1994)
In 1954, the ensemble started giving season performances in Wallenstein  Pallace, and later in Rudolfinum) in Prague (6 concerts, later 12 concerts per year). In four decades, several hundreds of compositions were introduced here, including scores of premiered archive pieces. Live recordings of Ars Rediviva performances in Rudolfinum are deposited in the Czech Museum of Music.

Repertoire, recordings
Ars Rediviva was the first ensemble in Czechoslovakia to record a large number of works of Johann Sebastian Bach (LPs of the complete Brandenburg concertos, The Art of Fugue, The Musical Offering, trio sonatas, flute sonatas, cantatas, concerto reconstructions, etc.), Bach's sons (Carl Philipp Emanuel Bach: sonatas, sinfonie symphonies, concerts; Wilhelm Friedemann Bach: sinfonies symphonies, sonatas; Johann Christian Bach: chamber music, symphonies), Antonio Vivaldi (concertos, sonatas, Stabat Mater), Jean-Philippe Rameau (e.g. Pièces en Concerts), François Couperin (Les Apothéoses, Les Goûts réunis), Georg Philipp Telemann (concertos, orchestral suites, Nouveaux Quatuors, Tafelmusik, Essercizii musici, Der harmonische Gottesdienst, cantatas), Jan Dismas Zelenka (trio sonatas ZWV 181, orchestral works, Lamentationes Jeremiae Prophetae), František Benda (sonatas, flute concertos),  Jiří Antonín Benda (Ariadne auf Naxos, Bendas Klage, sonatas, concertos), etc. (for more see External links: Ars Rediviva Discography). The ensemble recorded for Supraphon, Panton, Columbia, Ariola, CBS, Orfeo, Nippon, Deutsche Grammophon, Sony, as well as for broadcasting and television companies and film industry (awards: Grand Prix du Disque, Supraphon Golden Lion, etc.).

Jan Tausinger, Ivan Jirko, Ilja Hurník, and other Czech composers dedicated their neoclassical compositions to Ars Rediviva (e.g., Hurník's Sonata da Camera, Concerto for Flute and Chamber Orchestra.

References

External links

Documents, discography
 František Sláma Archive : Ars Rediviva . Documents - Photographs - Sound Archive
 Milan Munclinger in Documents and Reminiscences 
  Viktorie Švihlíková . Documents - Photographs
 Czech Philharmonic Instrumentalists and Ars Rediviva 
 Ars Rediviva Discography: Recordings with Supraphon and Panton 1954-1984 
  Czech Radio: Ars Rediviva recordings

Other links
 WorldCat Libraries
 J.S.Bach Home Page
 Bach: Concertos For Flute And Strings, Reconstruction Milan Munclinger, J.P.Rampal, Ars Rediviva
 Franz Benda: Concertos For Flute, Andras Adorján, Ars Rediviva
 Lamentationes Jeremiae Prophetae, Nedda Casei, Ars Rediviva
 Czech Radio: I.Hurník's compositions inspired by Milan Munclinger and Ars Rediviva
  Czech Radio: Prague Spring and Munclinger's Ars Rediviva
  Czech Radio: Baroque Music Performance and Ars Rediviva
  Czech Radio: Legendary Performers (Solo for Josef Hála)
  Czech Radio: Legendary Performers (Solo for Karel Bidlo)
  Publicist Ivan Medek about Milan Munclinger and Ars Rediviva

Musical groups established in 1951
Musical groups disestablished in 2002
Instrumental early music groups
Czech classical music groups
Early music orchestras
1951 establishments in Czechoslovakia
2002 disestablishments in the Czech Republic
Disbanded orchestras